Here Kitty Kittee is the second album by Canadian pop singer Elise Estrada. It was released on November 9, 2010.

Track listing

Notes
The release date of Estrada's second, November 9, 2010, was the same date as the release of Activision's Call of Duty: Black Ops.
"First Degree" served as the theme song for Love Court.

References

2010 albums
Elise Estrada albums